Joker's Wild or Jokers Wild may refer to:

Joker (playing card), when used as a Wild card
Joker's Wild (film), an American 2016 horror thriller film starring Eric Roberts
The Joker's Wild, an American TV game show
Jokers Wild (TV series), a British comedy panel show
"Joker's Wild" (Batman: The Animated Series), a 1992 episode of Batman: The Animated Series
Jokers Wild (novel), a 1987 novel in the Wild Cards series by George R. R. Martin
Jokers Wild (band), a 1960s UK blues-rock band
Joker's Wild (quartet), an American barbershop quartet
"The Joker's Wild", a song by Insane Clown Posse from Riddle Box
Jokers Wild Casino, a casino in Henderson, Nevada, U.S.
Joker's Wild, a wrestling tournament promoted by TNA One Night Only
The Joker Is Wild 1957 film directed by Charles Vidor

See also
Jokers in Solitaire
Joker (disambiguation)
Wild card (disambiguation)